Greg Packham (born 1 March 1959) is a former Australian rules footballer who played with St Kilda in the Victorian Football League (VFL) during the 1980s.

From Ballarat, Packham started his career at St Kilda in 1982 and kicked 24 goals from 12 appearances that year. He played just five further games for St Kilda and finished with an unusual statistic of having kicked at least one goal in every one of his 17 league games.

The red haired forward then returned to his original club Redan and in 1981 won the Henderson Medal, awarded to the best and fairest player in the Ballarat Football League. He was later named as a forward pocket in Redan's official "Team of the 20th Century".

In 1985, he played for Caulfield in the Victorian Football Association, and he finished second in the J. Field Medal for best and fairest of Division 2. In 1986, he tied for the Grogan Medal, with Coorparoo's Brendan McMullen, in the 1986 Queensland Australian Football League season with Kedron.

References

1959 births
Australian rules footballers from Victoria (Australia)
St Kilda Football Club players
Caulfield Football Club players
Kedron Football Club players
Redan Football Club players
Living people